The East Lake Shore Drive District is a historic district in the Near North Side community area of Chicago, Illinois.  It includes eight buildings at 140 E. Walton, 179-229 E. Lake Shore Drive, and 999 N. Lake Shore Drive designed by Marshall and Fox and Fugard & Knapp and the opposing park.  It was designated a Chicago Landmark district on April 18, 1985.  These buildings include seven luxury high rise apartment buildings and the Drake Hotel.  Note that neither of the buildings on either end of the district actually has an East Lake Shore Drive address. This district is located within the Streeterville neighborhood and overlaps with the Gold Coast.

, East Lake Shore Drive ranked as the 6th wealthiest neighborhood in America with a median household income of $593,454.

Photos

Notes

External links
Official City of Chicago Near North Side Community Map

Central Chicago
Historic districts in Chicago
Chicago Landmarks
1910s architecture in the United States
1920s architecture in the United States